Leighton may refer to:

Places 
In Australia:
Leighton, Western Australia, a beachside locality

In the United Kingdom:
Leighton, Cambridgeshire
Leighton, Cheshire
Leighton, North Yorkshire
Leighton Reservoir
Leighton, Shropshire
Leighton Buzzard, a town in Bedfordshire, England
Leighton Hall, Lancashire
Leighton Hall, Powys, including Leighton Model Farm
Leighton House, Wiltshire, a country house
Leighton House Museum, a museum in London
Leighton Library, an historic library in Dunblane, Scotland
RSPB Leighton Moss, English nature reserve

In the United States:
Leighton, Alabama
Leighton, Iowa
Leighton Township, Michigan

In Asia:

 Leighton Hill, Hong Kong

People
 Leighton (given name)
 Leighton (surname)

Other uses 
 CIMIC Group, Australian project development and contracting company until 2015 known as Leighton Holdings
 Leighton Asia, a construction contractor headquartered in Hong Kong
 Leighton Middle School, a middle school in Leighton Buzzard, England
 Leighton Park School, an independent secondary school in Reading, England

See also 

 
 Leyton (disambiguation)
 Layton (disambiguation)